The Arkansas Teachers Association Headquarters Building and Professional Services Building are a pair of historic commercial buildings at 1304 and 1306 Wright Street in Little Rock, Arkansas.  Occupying adjacent lots with a shared parking area and landscaping, the two buildings are both single-story brick structures, designed by George Tschiemer & Associates and built in the early 1960s.  The buildings were listed as a pair on the National Register of Historic Places in 2018, for the role of the Arkansas Teachers Association, an association of African-American educators, in its work during the Civil Rights Era of the 1960s to end segregation in the state.

See also
National Register of Historic Places listings in Little Rock, Arkansas

References

Commercial buildings on the National Register of Historic Places in Arkansas
Commercial buildings completed in 1962
Buildings and structures in Little Rock, Arkansas
National Register of Historic Places in Little Rock, Arkansas